Mastax sudanica is a species of beetle in the family Carabidae found in Chad and Sudan.

References

Mastax sudanica
Beetles of Africa
Beetles described in 1959